Alejandro Dumbrigue Aclan (born February 9, 1951) is a Philippine-born American prelate of the Roman Catholic Church, serving as an auxiliary bishop for the Archdiocese of Los Angeles in California since 2019.

Biography

Early life 
Alejandro Aclan was born on February 9, 1951, in Pasay City in the Philippines, the third of eight children born to Geronimo and Emerenciana Aclan. His father Geronimo served as a pilot in the Philippine Army Air Corps during World War II and is considered a war hero in the Philippines.

Before Aclan entered high school, his family moved from Manila to Makati, Phillipines.  While attending a high school operated by the Salesians of Don Bosco, he began thinking about joining the priesthood.  After finishing high school, Aclan entered the University of Santo Tomas in Manila to study medicine, but instead graduated in 1971 with a degree in medical technology. After graduation, Aclan taught at the university for a period of time, then started working for corporations as a programmer and systems analyst.  He eventually reached middle management positions for San Miguel Corporation and Citibank Philippines.

In 1982, Aclan and his family immigrated to Covina, California, where he took a position at Union Bank of California.  While still working at the bank, he started seriously exploring the idea of become a priest.  In 1988, Aclan entered St. John’s Seminary in Camarillo, California.

Priesthood 
On June 5, 1993, Aclan was ordained to the priesthood for the Archdiocese of Los Angeles by Cardinal Roger Mahoney at the Cathedral of St. Vibiana in Los Angeles.  Between 1993 and 2001, Aclan served as an associate pastor at St. Finbar Parish in Burbank, California, then at St. John of God Parish in Norwalk, California.  During these pastoral assignments, Aclan also served as director of vocations in progress (1996 to 1999).

Aclan was assigned as pastor in 2001 for St. Madeleine Parish in Pomona, California, staying there for the next 11 years. While at St Madeleine, he also served as treasurer/council of priests (2006-2010) and as regional vocations director for the San Gabriel Valley Pastoral Region (2010-2012).  In 2014, Aclan was appointed as vicar for clergy for the archdiocese and in 2017 was elevated by the Vatican to prelate of honor, with the title of monsignor.

Auxiliary Bishop of Los Angeles 
Pope Francis appointed Aclan as titular bishop of Rusicade and auxiliary bishop for the Archdiocese of Los Angeles on March 5, 2019.  On May 16, 2019, Aclan was consecrated as a bishop at Our Lady of the Angels Cathedral in Los Angeles by Archbishop José  Gómez.

As auxiliary bishop, Aclan was appointed episcopal vicar for the San Fernando Pastoral Region​ on May 16, 2019.  On April 2, 2021, Aclan attended a prayer vigil at Incarnation Church in Glendale, California to support Asian women across the United States who had been victims of hate crime attacks.

See also

 Catholic Church hierarchy
 Catholic Church in the United States
 Historical list of the Catholic bishops of the United States
 List of Catholic bishops of the United States
 Lists of patriarchs, archbishops, and bishops

References

External links
Roman Catholic Diocese of Los Angeles Official Site

Episcopal succession

 

1951 births
Living people
People from Pasay
21st-century Roman Catholic bishops in the United States
Bishops appointed by Pope Francis
Filipino emigrants to the United States